SM Bexel Co, Ltd. (formerly known as Bexel) is a South Korean chemical company specializing in battery manufacture.  It is headquartered in Yangpyeong-dong Yeongdeungpo-gu, Seoul and Gongdan-dong, Gumi, Gyeongsangbuk-do, South Korea. Founded in 1978, it also manufactures other electronic products. Manufacturing is based in Gumi, Gyeongsangbuk-do.

Products 
 Consumer battery
 OEM battery (Bexel & Supergard Brand)
 Package Battery - Rechargeable battery, Military Charger, Battery pack
 Worldwide Export Battery

See also 
 Economy of South Korea

References

External links 
 

Chemical companies of South Korea
Battery manufacturers
Consumer battery manufacturers
Manufacturing companies established in 1978
North Gyeongsang Province
South Korean brands